Mecyna auralis is a species of moth in the family Crambidae. It is found in Germany, France and Spain.

References

Moths described in 1872
Spilomelinae
Moths of Europe